Sir Robert Acton (by 1497 – 28/29 September 1558), of Elmley Lovett and Ribbesford, Worcestershire and Southwark, Surrey, was an English politician.

He was the second son of Richard Acton of Sutton, Worcestershire. He was knighted before 5 September 1543.

Career
He entered court as a Groom of the Chamber in 1518, became a page in 1526, a Gentleman Usher in 1528 and an Esquire of the Body in 1539. He was appointed Constable of Haverfordwest Castle, Pembrokeshire by 1532-52 or later. In 1536 he was called to serve against rebels in the north of England, in 1540 he attended the reception of Anne of Cleves and in 1544 he fought in the French campaign. "He succeeded his father-in-law as King’s saddler, and inherited half his goods and all his lands". In October 1532 Acton went with Henry VIII to Calais, fell ill there, and wrote to Cromwell for permission no to be present at the session of Parliament. In 1534 Acton was back in the House, his name was in a list of Members drawn up by Cromwell.

He was appointed for life as a Justice of the Peace to the benches of Worcestershire in 1537 and Surrey in 1538. He served as High Sheriff of Worcestershire for 1538–39 and 1545–46 and High Sheriff of Montgomeryshire for 1541–42 and 1548–49 and was elected a Member of Parliament for Southwark in 1529, 1539 and 1542. He was a member of the Council of the Marches of Wales in 1551.
And he probably also been re-elected to the Parliament of 1536, in accordance with the King's general request for the return of the previous Members.
After Henry VIII's death Acton remained on the commission of the peace but didn't take much part in public affairs.

Private life
He married Margery, the daughter and heiress of Nicholas Mayor of Southwark, with whom he had 2 sons and a daughter. He acquired substantial property, including Ribbesford in Worcestershire, Wormington Grange in Gloucestershire and Elmley Lovett in Worcestershire, which passed on his death to his sons.

Notes

References
 

Year of birth missing
1558 deaths
15th-century births
Politicians from Worcestershire
People from Southwark
High Sheriffs of Worcestershire
High Sheriffs of Montgomeryshire
English MPs 1529–1536
English MPs 1539–1540
English MPs 1542–1544
Esquires of the Body